= Roman vaults of Nuncio Viejo =

The Roman vaults of Nuncio Viejo are a Roman vaults located in Calle Nuncio Viejo street, in the city of Toledo, Castile-La Mancha, Spain

It is a system of walls and vaults that date, according to the archaeological studies practiced, of Roman age.

In the environment of these basements are two of the most important Roman remains found in the city: Roman baths of Toledo and cisterns of the water distribution network of the basements of Delegación de Hacienda.
